Archimedes Ridge [el. ] is a ridge in North Slope Borough, Alaska, in the United States.

Archimedes Ridge was so named because it resembles an Archimedes' screw in aerial photographs.

References

Landforms of North Slope Borough, Alaska
Ridges of Alaska